Liverpool Town Hall is a town hall in  Liverpool, England.  

Liverpool Town Hall may also refer to:

Liverpool Town Hall (Nova Scotia), a National Historic Site of Canada in Queens, Nova Scotia.